Wicha Nantasri (born January 15, 1986), or simply known as ฺBob, is a Thai professional footballer who plays as a midfielder for Thai League 2 club Samut Sakhon.

Personal life

Wicha's twin older brother Wichan is also a footballer.

Honours

Club
Loei City 
 Regional League North-East Division (2): 2009, 2010

References

External links
 

1986 births
Living people
Wicha Nantasri
Wicha Nantasri
Association football midfielders
Wicha Nantasri
Wicha Nantasri
Wicha Nantasri
Wicha Nantasri
Wicha Nantasri
Wicha Nantasri
Wicha Nantasri
Twin sportspeople
Wicha Nantasri